Crooked Creek Township may refer to one of the following places in the United States:

 Crooked Creek Township, Cumberland County, Illinois
 Crooked Creek Township, Jasper County, Illinois
 Crooked Creek Township, Houston County, Minnesota
 Crooked Creek Township, Bollinger County, Missouri

Township name disambiguation pages